The TMI Group of Companies is a multi-national organization that manufactures and markets physical property testing instruments for the packaging, paper, pulp, plastic film, foil, ink, coatings, nonwoven, textile, adhesives, and corrugated industries.

The TMI Group of Companies consists of Testing Machines Inc. (Delaware, USA), Büchel BV (Netherlands), Fibro System AB (Sweden), Lako Seal Testers (Delaware, USA), TMI Canada, and TMI Shanghai Ltd. (China).

History
TMI was founded in 1931 in New York, primarily as a distributor of laboratory testing instruments.  Since then, it has expanded to not only distribute, but also design and manufacture instruments.    Since 2009, The TMI Group has made five global acquisitions.  In 2010, the headquarters relocated from Ronkonkoma, NY, to the current green-energy facility in New Castle, DE.

Current Activities
The TMI Group's corporate headquarters are located in New Castle, Delaware, in a 20,000 square foot green-energy building. The facility is equipped with 160 solar panels, geo-thermal heating and cooling, and LED lighting.

In 2011, TMI was presented the Delaware Small Business Administration’s Family Owned Business of the Year award.

On March 14, 2014, TMI was acquired by Union Park Capital, a Boston-based private equity firm.

References

External links
 TMI website
 Fibro System AB website
 Union Park website
 בדיקת רישום בטאבו

Multinational companies headquartered in the United States
Manufacturing companies based in Delaware
Companies based in New Castle County, Delaware
American companies established in 1931
Manufacturing companies established in 1931
1931 establishments in New York (state)